The 2020 Capitalbox World RX of Finland was the third and fourth round of the seventh season of the FIA World Rallycross Championship. The event was held at the Tykkimäki amusement park in Kouvola.

In June 2020, an extraordinary World Motor Sport Council added an event in Kouvola (Finland) to replace the World RX of France as it was cancelled, due to the COVID-19 pandemic. The event was a double-header

Supercar Race 1 

Source

Heats

Semi-finals 

 Semi-Final 1

 Semi-Final 2

Final

Supercar Race 2 

Source

Heats

Semi-finals 

 Semi-Final 1

 Semi-Final 2

Final

Standings after the event 

Source

 Note: Only the top six positions are included.

References 

|- style="text-align:center"
|width="35%"|Previous race:2020 World RX of Sweden
|width="40%"|FIA World Rallycross Championship2020 season
|width="35%"|Next race:2020 World RX of Riga-Latvia
|- style="text-align:center"
|width="35%"|Previous race:2014 World RX of Finland
|width="40%"|World RX of Finland
|width="35%"|Next race:none
|- style="text-align:center"

Finland
World RX